Dan Baker (born 5 July 1992) is a Wales international rugby union player. A back row forward, he plays for Aberavon RFC, having previously played for the Dragons, Stade Montois, and the Ospreys.

Baker departed the Ospreys in 2020 for Pro D2 club Stade Montois. He joined the Dragons in February 2021 initially to play until the end of the season, but was later signed for the following season. Baker was released by the Dragons in 2022, and subsequently joined Aberavon RFC.

International
In May 2013 he was selected in the Wales national rugby union team 32 man training squad for the summer 2013 tour to Japan. He made his international debut against Japan on 8 June 2013

References

External links
 https://www.walesonline.co.uk/all-about/dan-baker

Wales international rugby union players
Welsh rugby union players
Ospreys (rugby union) players
1992 births
Rugby union players from Neath
Living people
Stade Montois players
Dragons RFC players
Rugby union number eights